Aa Te Kevi Dunniya is a 2015 comedy film, written and directed by Tejas Padiaa and produced by Vijay Khatri. The film stars Raj Jatania, Yatin Parmar, Kinjal Pandya and others. The film showcases a world in which karma, and not money, is considered currency. The film was released on 9 January 2015.

Cast
 Raj Jatania as Akash
 Yatin Parmar as Sameer
 Kinjal Pandya as Anjali
 Rajkumar Kanojia as Bhiku Bhikari
 Falguni Desai as Parsi Aunty
 Sanat Vyas as Gordhandas
 Sunil Visrani as Jagga
 Padmesh Pandit as Manj Baba

Production

Development
The film was produced by Vijay Khatri and written and directed by Tejas Padiaa. Well known Bollywood music director Viju Shah has given the music and background score. While Bollywood singer Nakash Aziz, the crooner of chartbusters, has sung two songs in the film.  The film tries to explore a world without money, where karma is currency.

Filming
The shooting of the film started in early 2014. It took place in some parts of Ahmedabad including famous Kankaria lake, Polo Forest - Vijay Nagar in Gujarat, India to name a few.

Casting
Aa Te Kevi Dunniya stars Raj Jatania, Yatin Parmar, Kinjal Pandya, Sunil Vishrani, Jayesh More, Krishna Pandya Rawal, RajKumar Kanojia, Falguni Desai, Padmesh Pandit and Sanat Vyas.

Reception
The film received positive reviews on the release. Divya Bhaskar rated it 3/5 and called it a fun film. The Times of India rated it 3.5/5 and said the film "will not leave you disappointed." Bollywood filmmaker Satish Kaushik praised the film calling it "positive, bright and a scaling thought."

References

External links
 

Indian comedy films
2015 films
Films shot in Ahmedabad
Films set in Ahmedabad
Films scored by Viju Shah
2015 comedy films
2010s Gujarati-language films